Novoustinovka is a rural locality (a village) in Arkhangelsky Selsoviet, Arkhangelsky District, Bashkortostan, Russia. The population was 159 as of 2010. There are 5 streets.

Geography 
Novoustinovka is located 7 km northwest of Arkhangelskoye (the district's administrative centre) by road. Arkhangelskoye is the nearest rural locality.

References 

Rural localities in Arkhangelsky District